This is a list of British Regular Army regiments as constituted as a result of the British defence white paper Delivering Security in a Changing World in 2004 and "Delivering Security in a Changing World Future Capabilities" in 2005.

Cavalry

Household Cavalry

Household Cavalry Regiment and Household Cavalry Mounted Regiment
The Life Guards
The Blues and Royals (Royal Horse Guards and 1st Dragoons)

Royal Armoured Corps

Heavy Cavalry
1st The Queen's Dragoon Guards
The Royal Scots Dragoon Guards (Carabiniers and Greys)
The Royal Dragoon Guards

Light Cavalry
The Queen's Royal Hussars (The Queen's Own and Royal Irish)
9th/12th Royal Lancers (Prince of Wales's)
The King's Royal Hussars
The Light Dragoons 
The Queen's Royal Lancers

The Royal Tank Regiment
1st Royal Tank Regiment
2nd Royal Tank Regiment

Infantry
Note: When a regiment is described as having n + n battalions, the first number is regular army battalions, and the second is Territorial Army battalions.

Foot Guards
Grenadier Guards - 1 + 0 battalion
Coldstream Guards - 1 + 0 battalion
Scots Guards - 1 + 0 battalion
Irish Guards - 1 + 0 battalion
Welsh Guards - 1 + 0 battalion
London Regiment - 0 + 1 battalion

Line Infantry
Royal Regiment of Scotland - 5 + 2 battalions formed by an amalgamation of:
The Royal Scots (The Royal Regiment)
The King's Own Scottish Borderers
The Royal Highland Fusiliers (Princess Margaret's Own Glasgow and Ayrshire Regiment) 
The Black Watch (Royal Highland Regiment) 
The Highlanders (Seaforth, Gordons and Camerons)
The Argyll and Sutherland Highlanders (Princess Louise's)
Princess of Wales's Royal Regiment (Queen's and Royal Hampshires) - 2 + 1 battalions
Duke of Lancaster's Regiment (King's Lancashire and Border) - 3 + 1 battalions formed by an amalgamation of:
King's Own Royal Border Regiment
King's Regiment
Queen's Lancashire Regiment
Royal Regiment of Fusiliers - 2 + 1 battalions 
Royal Anglian Regiment - 2 + 1 battalions
Yorkshire Regiment (14th/15th, 19th and 33rd/76th Foot) - 3 + 1 battalions formed by an amalgamation of:
Prince of Wales's Own Regiment of Yorkshire
The Green Howards (Alexandra, Princess of Wales's Own Yorkshire Regiment)
The Duke of Wellington's Regiment (West Riding)
Mercian Regiment - 3 + 1 battalions formed by an amalgamation of:
22nd (Cheshire) Regiment
Worcestershire and Sherwood Foresters Regiment (29th/45th Foot)
The Staffordshire Regiment (The Prince of Wales's)
Royal Welsh - 2 + 1 battalions formed by an amalgamation of:
Royal Welch Fusiliers
Royal Regiment of Wales (24th/41st Foot)
Royal Irish Regiment (27th (Inniskilling) 83rd and 87th and The Ulster Defence Regiment) - 1 + 1 battalion
Parachute Regiment - 3 + 1 battalions 
Royal Gurkha Rifles - 2 + 0 battalions
The Rifles - 5 + 2 battalions formed by an amalgamation of:
Devonshire and Dorset Light Infantry
The Light Infantry
Royal Gloucestershire, Berkshire and Wiltshire Light Infantry
Royal Green Jackets

Special Forces
Special Air Service
Special Reconnaissance Regiment
Special Forces Support Group

The Army Air Corps
Army Air Corps

Support Arms and Services

Support Arms
Royal Regiment of Artillery
Corps of Royal Engineers
Royal Corps of Signals
Intelligence Corps

Services
Royal Army Chaplains Department
Royal Logistic Corps    
Royal Army Medical Corps   
Corps of Royal Electrical and Mechanical Engineers    
Adjutant General's Corps
Royal Army Veterinary Corps   
Small Arms School Corps   
Royal Army Dental Corps 
Army Physical Training Corps (Granted 'Royal' prefix in 2010)    
General Service Corps   
Queen Alexandra's Royal Army Nursing Corps    
Corps of Army Music

External links
 UK MoD: Delivering Security in a Changing World (PDF)
 Delivering Security in a Changing World: Future Capabilities
 House of Commons Hansard: Future Capabilities

Notes

British Army regiments (2008)